Development and Justice Party of Islamic Iran or Islamic Iran Development and Justice Party is a conservative political party in Iran, with a claimed goal of "increasing public participation in politics".

Mohsen Rezai is the man behind the party, which consists mainly of Revolutionary Guard commanders who served in the Iran-Iraq War. His brother Omidvar Rezai is said to have a leading role in the party. Other senior members include Abdolhossein Rouhalamini and Reza Talaei-Nik (both former Secretaries-General), Kamal Daneshyar and Amir-Ali Amiri. The party backed Mohsen Rezai for president in 2009 and 2013.

References

External links

2007 establishments in Iran
Principlist political groups in Iran
Political parties established in 2007